Houtkerque (from ) is a commune in the Nord department in northern France. The river Yser crosses the border at Houtkerque.

Houtkerque saw much action during World War I. Seven Commonwealth war graves are situated within Houtkerque's church.

Heraldry

See also
Communes of the Nord department

References

Communes of Nord (French department)
French Flanders